Bashkortostan (Başqortostan) is a rural locality (a village) in Kazanchinsky Selsoviet, Askinsky District, Bashkortostan, Russia. The population was 45 as of 2010. There is 1 street.

Geography 
It is located 40 km from Askino and 5 km from Starye Kazanchi.

References 

Rural localities in Askinsky District